Qi was a minor feudal state in ancient China that existed from the beginning of the Shang Dynasty (16th century BCE) until the beginning of the Warring States period, c. 445 BCE.

History
The state of Qi was founded when the first king of the Shang Dynasty enfeoffed the direct descendants of the royal family of the deposed Xia Dynasty in the area that is now Qi County in Kaifeng, eastern Henan Province. This practice was referred to as "the two crownings and the three respects" (二王三恪). The state of Qi gradually moved eastward to the area of Xintai in Shandong Province until it was finally destroyed by King Hui of Chu.

The state of Qi was apparently very small in scale, as it is rarely mentioned in ancient Chinese documents except to say that "its affairs are not worth mentioning." It is perhaps best known as the inspiration for the popular Chinese idiom, 杞人忧天 (杞人憂天) (Qǐ rén yōu tiān, literally, "Qi people lament heaven" or "the people of Qi worry about the sky"), which is said to refer to the fact that the people of Qi often talked anxiously about the sky falling down on their heads. The idiom is used when mocking a person's needless anxiety over an impossible, inconsequential, or inevitable matter.  That being said, its ruler also belonged to the highest feudal rank below king—a duke (公).  It is one of the few duchies actually erected by royal edict, compared to the many that were self-declared.

In terms of culture, however, the state of Qi - being descended from the royal house of the Xia Dynasty - held considerable importance, for it followed the ancient rituals of the Xia. Confucius, being interested in ancient rites, visited Qi to see them for himself. However, his verdict sounded not quite approvingly: "I could discuss the ritual of the Xia, but the Qi [kingdom] does not sufficiently attest to my words"  (Analects 3:9).

References

Ancient Chinese states
Xia dynasty
Former monarchies